The Women's 15 kilometre individual biathlon competition at the 1998 Winter Olympics was held on 9 February, at Nozawa Onsen. Competitors raced over five loops of a 3.0 kilometre skiing course, shooting four times, twice prone and twice standing. Each miss resulted in one minute being added to a competitor's skiing time.

Results

References

External links
Sports-Reference.com - Women's 15 km Individual

Women's biathlon at the 1998 Winter Olympics
Biath
Women's events at the 1998 Winter Olympics